Olney Street–Alumni Avenue Historic District is a residential historic district in northeastern Providence, Rhode Island.  Located just north of the Moses Brown School campus, this is an enclave of 53 tasteful yet conservative houses built between about 1880 and 1938.  It includes houses along Olney Street and Alumni Avenue between Hope and Arlington Streets, and includes a few houses on adjacent streets.  Most of these houses are uniformly set back from the street, even though there was no zoning requiring that at the time, and are of brick and/or wood construction.  They are stylistically heterogeneous, with Queen Anne and the Colonial Revival predominating.

The district was listed on the National Register of Historic Places in 1989.

See also
National Register of Historic Places listings in Providence, Rhode Island

References

Historic districts in Providence County, Rhode Island
Geography of Providence, Rhode Island
National Register of Historic Places in Providence, Rhode Island
Historic districts on the National Register of Historic Places in Rhode Island